Kalaena River is a river in South Sulawesi, Sulawesi island, Indonesia, about 1600 km northeast of the capital Jakarta.

Geography
The river flows in the center of Sulawesi with predominantly tropical rainforest climate (designated as Af in the Köppen-Geiger climate classification). The annual average temperature in the area is 22 °C. The warmest month is September, when the average temperature is around 24 °C, and the coldest is March, at 22 °C. The average annual rainfall is 4176 mm. The wettest month is April, with an average of 660 mm rainfall, and the driest is September, with 117 mm rainfall.

See also
List of rivers of Indonesia
List of rivers of Sulawesi

References

Rivers of South Sulawesi
Rivers of Indonesia